Jazvan may refer to:
 Jazvan, Hamadan
 Jazvan, Zanjan